The eighteenth Connecticut House of Representatives district elects one member of the Connecticut House of Representatives. Its current representative is Jillian Gilchrest. The district consists of part of the town of West Hartford.

List of representatives

Recent elections

External links
 Google Maps - Connecticut House Districts

References

18